Hezar Jerib or Hezar Jarib or Hazar Jarib or Hazar Jerib may refer to:

Hezar Jerib, Chaharmahal and Bakhtiari
Hezar Jerib, Hamadan
Hezar Jarib, Isfahan
Hezar Jerib, Lorestan
Hezarjarib District, Mazandaran Province